The 2020 Presbyterian Blue Hose football team represented Presbyterian College in the 2020–21 NCAA Division I FCS football season as a technical FCS independent but in a scheduling agreement with the Pioneer Football League (PFL), which it fully joined in July 2021. Under the agreement, Presbyterian was not eligible for the PFL title, but its players and coaches were eligible for individual PFL honors. They were led by tenth-year head coach Tommy Spangler, in his second stint as Presbyterian's head coach, as he coached the Blue Hose from 2001 to 2006 and resumed in 2017. The Blue Hose play their home games at Bailey Memorial Stadium.

On March 4, it was announced that Roland Matthews would be promoted to defensive coordinator after spending four years as defensive line coach.

Previous season

The Blue Hose finished the 2019 season 2–10, 1–5 in Big South play to finish in a three-way tie for fifth place.

Schedule

References

Presbyterian
Presbyterian Blue Hose football seasons
Presbyterian Blue Hose football